Marischal Museum was a museum in Aberdeen, Scotland, specialising in anthropology and artifacts from cultures around the world. The museum was a part of the University of Aberdeen, situated at Marischal College, a grand neo-gothic building said to be the second-largest granite building in the world, displaying collections owned by the University. The museum is closed to the public, but now operates as the University of Aberdeen's museum collections centre.

Notable Collections
The museum most notably housed examples of Egyptian and Classical antiquities, non-Western ethnography and pieces relating to Scottish prehistory and numismatics. The collections are part of the University of Aberdeen's museum collections which have been recognised as being of national significance by the Scottish Government.

Closure
The museum has been closed since July 2008 due to renovation work at Marischal College. Although part of Marischal College re-opened after renovation in Summer 2011 as the corporate headquarters of Aberdeen City Council, the museum remains closed to the public.  It now operates as a museum collections centre, with conservation laboratory, research stores, offices and workshop, supporting the work of the University of Aberdeen's museums elsewhere.

To allow the public to continue to view exhibits from its collections, in April 2011 the University of Aberdeen opened King's Museum. This is a small museum (much smaller than Marischal Museum) located in the Old Aberdeen Town House, which is part of the King's College campus in Old Aberdeen, King's Museum hosts a range of changing exhibitions, drawing on objects from the University's stored collections, primarily those formerly displayed in Marischal Museum.

External links
 Marischal Museum website
 King's Museum website

Museums in Aberdeen
University of Aberdeen
University museums in Scotland
Egyptological collections in Scotland
Ethnographic museums in the United Kingdom
History museums in Scotland
Museums established in 1786
1786 establishments in Scotland
Anthropology museums in the United Kingdom
Defunct museums in Scotland